Edwin Arnold "Ed" Panagabko (May 17, 1934 in Norquay, Saskatchewan — January 18, 1979) was a Canadian ice hockey player who played 29 games in the National Hockey League with the Boston Bruins between 1955 and 1957. The rest of his career, which lasted from 1954 to 1968, was spent in the American Hockey League (AHL) and Western Hockey League (WHL). As captain of the San Francisco Seals he won the Lester Patrick Cup as WHL champion twice (1962–1963 and 1963–1964). He is interred at Skylawn Memorial Park in San Mateo, California.

Career statistics

Regular season and playoffs

References 
 

1934 births
1979 deaths
Boston Bruins players
Canadian ice hockey centres
Grand Rapids Rockets players
Hershey Bears players
Humboldt Indians players
Ice hockey people from Saskatchewan
Los Angeles Blades (WHL) players
Melville Millionaires players
Portland Buckaroos players
Providence Reds players
San Diego Gulls (WHL) players
San Francisco Seals (ice hockey) players
Seattle Bombers players